Tjeerd Sicco van Albada (born 14 October 1936) is a Dutch astronomer and emeritus professor of Astronomy at the University of Groningen.

Career 
Van Albada was born on 14 October 1936 in Akkrum. He obtained his PhD in mathematics and natural sciences from the University of Groningen in 1968. He was lecturer of astronomy at the same university between 1971 and 1979. In 1980 he became professor of Astronomy, and worked at the Kapteyn Astronomical Institute. He took up emeritus status in 2001.

Van Albada became a member of the Royal Netherlands Academy of Arts and Sciences in 1984.

Honors 
On 5 July 2001, the central main-belt asteroid 10435 Tjeerd, discovered during the Palomar–Leiden survey in 1960, was named after him.

References

External links
 Profile on Mathematics Genealogy Project
 Profile on NARCIS

1936 births
Living people
20th-century Dutch astronomers
Members of the Royal Netherlands Academy of Arts and Sciences
People from Heerenveen
University of Groningen alumni
Academic staff of the University of Groningen